Stalingrad is an oil painting by the Danish artist Asger Jorn depicting the futility of war. Considered to be one of Denmark's artistic masterpieces, it was included in the 2006 Danish Culture Canon. The canvas, now hangs in Museum Jorn, Silkeborg.

Background
In the 1950s, after a long and difficult period in hospital suffering from tuberculosis, Jorn had embarked on figurative painting hoping to establish himself at the European level. He often reacted against the works, overpainting the edges or the background. By 1956, he had set up a studio in the little Italian town of Albisola near Genoa where he began to compose a large painting he called La ritirata di Russia (The Retreat from Russia). The painting had been inspired by stories told by his friend Umberto Gambetta, who had fought with the Italians in the Battle of Stalingrad (1942–1943) before spending years in Russian prisoner-of-war camps from which few survived. The canvas had detailed these events to such an extent that Gambetta referred to it as "my portrait". Jorn ensured that all such personal references were covered over so as to enhance the work's universal significance. He then titled it Le fou rire (sometimes translated The Mad Laughter) and sent it off to Brussels where a collector had shown interest in a large painting by Jorn. In fact it was acquired by the restaurant owner Albert Niels who allowed Jorn to come and work on it further. It was also seen by the Dutch museum expert Willem Sandberg who arranged for it to be sent to the Seattle World Fair in 1961. In that connection, it was renamed Stalingrad.

Description
Like Picasso's painting Guernica, the painting addresses the horrors of war, in this case depicting the Battle of Stalingrad, one of the most notable events of the Second World War. Jorn's impression of warfare is conveyed above all in the process behind the painting. Indeed, his thick coating of colour is more of a process in its own right than a representation, revealing war as a phenomenon beyond man's understanding. Stalingrad could be seen as an enormous battlefield where all traces of mankind and civilisation were buried under layers of snow. An outline of a body or the suggestion of a face can perhaps be discerned but under the surface, the destruction and upheaval are already fading from memory. Jorn sees war as a tragedy of madness, completely devoid of heroism. Created at a time when mankind lived under the threat of nuclear war, the painting can be seen as the artist's personal expression of a world lamenting its own end.

A long history
The painting also expresses Jorn's own experiences and his fight for existence. He referred to it as a work he could continue to paint throughout his life. In the mid-1960s, he therefore bought it back, presenting it to the Silkeborg Museum in 1966. It was exhibited in Paris and Cuba before being hung in the old school which then served as the museum. It was there that Jorn would work on final adjustments, adding a few black dots representing houses in December 1972, shortly before he died.

References

External links
Stalingrad at Museum Jorn (with illustration)

Danish paintings
War paintings
Danish Culture Canon
1972 paintings
Battle of Stalingrad
20th-century paintings in Denmark